DiMarzio, Inc. (original name: DiMarzio Musical Instrument Pickups, Inc.) is an American manufacturer best known for its direct-replacement guitar pickups. The company also produces other guitar accessories, such as cables, straps and hardware.

DiMarzio became known for its Super Distortion model, which was the first after-market replacement guitar pickup. It was introduced in 1972 and is still considered one of the most popular models.

The Super Distortion pickup produced a higher electrical output than most pickups normally fitted as standard to guitars at the time. It has around twice the output of a PAF-type pickup, and stronger ceramic magnets. This drove the input stage of guitar amplifiers with roughly twice as much voltage as a PAF pickup, so that an overdriven distorted sound was easier to obtain.

Two of the technologies that they are known for are:
 Dual-Resonance design, which uses different size wire gauges to produce a different resonant peak for each coil, providing unique sounds.
 Airbucker™ design, which reduces string pull and increases sensitivity and sustain.

Notable users past and present 

 Buckethead (X2N, Air Norton, ToneZone)
 Tosin Abasi of Animals as Leaders (Previously used Ionizer)
 Jason Becker (PAF Pro, HS-2, Tone Zone)
 Jake Bowen of Periphery (band) (Previously used Crunch Lab and LiquiFire, now uses his signature Titans)
 Chris Broderick of Megadeth (D Activators, now his own custom pickups)
 Ron "Bumblefoot" Thal (Tone Zone, Chopper)
 Rob Caggiano of Anthrax and The Damned Things (Tone Zone, Humbucker From Hell, Air Norton, FRED)
 Vivian Campbell of Def Leppard, Last in Line and Dio (band) (Super distortion, Super 3)
 Manny Charlton of Nazareth (Super Distortion)
 "Fast" Eddie Clarke of Motörhead (X2N, SDS-1, Super Distortion)
 Kurt Cobain of Nirvana (Super Distortion, PAF)
 Phil Collen of Def Leppard (Super Distortion, Super 3)
 Billy Corgan of The Smashing Pumpkins (Previously used DiMarzio Tone Zone S, The Chopper, Air Norton S, and his signature DiMarzio BC-1 and BC-2)
 J.D. Cronise of The Sword (Super Distortion)
 Dave Davidson of Revocation (Previously used DiMarzio D Activator Bridge, Liquifire neck and Super 2 neck pickups, now uses his signature Imperium pickups)
 Tom DeLonge of Angels & Airwaves and formerly Blink-182 (Previously used X2N)
 Al Di Meola (Super Distortion pickups in the 1970s, and signature model neck (DP201) and bridge (DP202) pickups from the DiMarzio Custom Shop)
 The Edge of U2 (FS-1)
 Ace Frehley of KISS (Super Distortion, PAF)
 Jerry Garcia (SDS-1, Super 2, Dual Sound)
 Paul Gilbert (PAF Pro, Super Distortion, Humbucker From Hell, Air Classic Neck & Bridge, Tone Zone, Area 67, The Injector, PG-13 mini humbuckers)
 David Gilmour of Pink Floyd (FS-1)
 Chris Goss of Masters of Reality (X2N)
 Page Hamilton of Helmet (Air Zone)
 Jeff Hanneman of Slayer (Super Distortion in early Gibson Les Paul for neck position)
 Tim Henson of Polyphia (Air Norton, Gravity Storm, his signature Notorious mini humbucker and lipstick single coils)
 Scott LePage of Polyphia (D Activators, True Velvet single coils, his signature Igno humbucker)
 Terrance Hobbs of Suffocation (band) (Super Distortion)
 Josh Homme of Kyuss and Queens of the Stone Age (Super 2 in his Ovation Ultra GP)
 Greg Howe (Air Norton S Neck and Custom GH5 Bridge)
 John Five (D Activators)
 Eric Johnson (EJ Custom, HS-2)
 Ehsan Keramati (Tone Zone, PAF)
 Kerry King of Slayer (Super Distortion in early BC Rich Mockingbird)
 Richie Kotzen (Chopper T, Twang King, his signature custom Strat loaded pickguard)
 Rocky Kramer (Air Norton, Tone Zone & Super Distortion in Fender Stratocasters & Telecasters)
 Herman Li of DragonForce (Evolution, Blaze, Fast Track I, HLM)
 Steve Lukather (Transition)
 Yngwie Malmsteen (previously used HS3 and HS4, FS-1)
 Jim Martin of Faith No More
 Hank Marvin of The Shadows (FS-1 fitted to his Fender Stratocasters throughout the 70's and 80's and used in the bridge position in his Signature Stratocasters)
 Steve Morse (Steve Morse Model)
 Mark Morton of Lamb of God (band) (His signature Dominion pickups)
 Dave Murray of Iron Maiden (Super Distortion, PAF)
 Noodles of The Offspring (Tone Zone)
 John Norum of Europe (FS-1, HS3, Super Distortion, Super 3)
 John Petrucci of Dream Theater (Humbucker From Hell, Tone Zone, Blaze, Air Norton, Steve's Special, Custom Modded Air Norton and Steve's Special, D-Sonic, LiquiFire and Crunch Lab, Illuminator, Sonic Ecstasy, Dreamcatcher, Rainmaker)
 Randy Rhoads (Super Distortion, PAF)
 Michael Romeo of Symphony X (Tone Zone, X2N)
 Richie Sambora of Bon Jovi (used a DiMarzio PAF Pro humbucker in his now discontinued Fender Stratocaster signature model)
 Joe Satriani (PAF Joe, PAF Pro, FRED, Mo' Joe, Pro Track, Satch Track, Satchur8)
 Billy Sheehan (Model One, Model P, Will Power, Relentless)
 Tom Scholz of Boston (P-90, Super Distortion)
 Chuck Schuldiner of Death (band) (X2N)
 James "Munky" Shaffer of Korn (Blaze)
 Dave Sharman (The Tone Zone, Super Distortion)
 Matt Skiba of Alkaline Trio and Blink-182 is known to use Dimarzio PAF pickups occasionally
 Adrian Smith of Iron Maiden (Super Distortion)
 Bernard Sumner of Joy Division used DiMarzio humbuckers in his modified Shergold Masquerader.
 Andy Timmons (The Cruiser single coil sized humbuckers, His signature AT1 humbucker)
 Sam Totman of DragonForce (Evolution, HLM)
 Pete Townshend of The Who (Dual Sound)
 Steve Vai (X2N, PAF Pro, The Breed, Evolution, Evo 2, Blaze, Blaze II, Gravity Storm, Dark Matter 2, UtoPia)
 Eddie Van Halen (Super Distortion, custom humbuckers on his Ernie Ball Music Man signature guitar).
 Leslie West of Mountain (Megadrive, Fast Track II)
 Frank Zappa (used Dimarzio pickups in the Les Paul that he used in the 80s although it was later outfitted with Carvin and later Seymour Duncan pickups, thought to be a Super Distortion and PAF or PAF Pro but never confirmed).

Patents
Lawrence P. DiMarzio holds following US patents:

 
 
  — a special container for merchandising pickups.

References

Further reading 
 Guitar World Magazine, "The 100 Most Important People In Guitar", San Francisco, CA, May 1994.

External links 

 
 The DiMarzio Forum
 DiMarzio Magazine
 DiMarzio Gallery
 NY Entity Information

Guitar pickup manufacturers
Manufacturing companies based in New York City
Companies based in Staten Island